Gore Mountain is a mountain located in the uninhabited Avery's Gore in Essex County, Vermont, about 6 miles (10 km) south of the Canada–US border with Quebec.   In Vermont, gores and grants are unincorporated portions of a county which are not part of any town and have limited self-government (if any, as many are uninhabited).
Gore Mtn. is flanked to the northeast by Black Mountain, and to the northwest by Middle Mountain.

The north and northwest sides of Gore Mountain drain via several short brooks into the Coaticook River, thence into the Massawippi River, Saint-François River, and Saint Lawrence River in Quebec, and thence into the Gulf of Saint Lawrence.
The southwest side of Gore Mtn. drains into Jim Carroll Brook, thence into the North Branch of the Nulhegan River, the Connecticut River, and into Long Island Sound in Connecticut.
The southeast side of Gore Mtn. drains into the Logger Branch, and the east side into the Black Branch, of the Nulhegan River.

See also 
 List of mountains in Vermont
 New England Fifty Finest

References 

Mountains of Vermont
Landforms of Essex County, Vermont